Singerocybe is a genus of fungi that contains six species. Singerocybe was circumscribed by the Finnish mycologist Harri Harmaja in 1988 with Singerocybe viscida as the type species.

Phylogenetically, it is closely related to Leucopaxillus and Entoloma.

Etymology 
Singerocybe was named after mycologist Rolf Singer.

Species 
 Singerocybe adirondackensis
 Singerocybe alboinfundibuliformis
 Singerocybe clitocyboides
 Singerocybe humilis
 Singerocybe phaeophthalma
 Singerocybe umbilicata
 Singerocybe viscida  (type species)

See also

List of Agaricales genera

References

External links

External links

Agaricales
Agaricales genera